Gholamreza Rashid Yasemi (born 1895 in Gahwareh, Kermanshah Province, Iran –  died 1951 in Tehran) was an Iranian-Kurdish poet, translator, academic and literary figure.

He finished his primary education in Kermanshah and then moved to Tehran in 1912 where he resided for the rest of his life. He completed his high school education at the French-language St. Louis School, a Catholic mission school in Tehran. After finishing his education, he became a founding member of the Daneshkadeh Literary Society (انجمن ادبی دانشکده) along with Mohammad-Taqi Bahar, Saeed Nafisi, Abbas Eqbal Ashtiani, and Abdolhossein Teymourtash in 1918. He also published his articles and research essays in Ali Dashti's famed Shafagh-e Sorkh newspaper (روزنامه شفق سرخ). He spoke Kurdish, French, English, Arabic and Pahlavi. He had 4 sons, Siamak Yasemi, Shapour Yasami, Bijan Yasami and Siavoush Yasami, and two daughters, Mina Yasami and Yasi Yasami. He died in 1951 after a stroke.

See also

Five-Masters

Notes

20th-century Iranian poets
Persian-language poets
Iranian translators
Iranian journalists
People from Kermanshah Province
1895 births
1951 deaths
Members of the Academy of Persian Language and Literature
20th-century poets
20th-century translators
20th-century journalists
19th-century Iranian poets